Zhelev Peak is the rocky peak rising to 1650 m on the west coast of Pernik Peninsula, Loubet Coast in Graham Land, Antarctica. The feature has steep and partly ice-free west slopes, and surmounts Lallemand Fjord to the west, Field Glacier to the north and its tributary Narezne Glacier to the northeast, and Haefeli Glacier to the south-southeast.

The peak is named after Zhelyu Zhelev (1935–2015), President of Bulgaria 1990–1997, for his support for the Bulgarian Antarctic programme.

Location
British mapping in 1978.

Maps
Antarctic Digital Database (ADD). Scale 1:250000 topographic map of Antarctica. Scientific Committee on Antarctic Research (SCAR). Since 1993, regularly upgraded and updated.
British Antarctic Territory. Scale 1:200000 topographic map. DOS 610 Series, Sheet W 67 66. Directorate of Overseas Surveys, Tolworth, UK, 1978.

References
 Bulgarian Antarctic Gazetteer. Antarctic Place-names Commission. (details in Bulgarian, basic data in English)
 Zhelev Peak. SCAR Composite Antarctic Gazetteer

External links
 Zhelev Peak. Copernix satellite image

Mountains of Graham Land
Bulgaria and the Antarctic
Loubet Coast